The 2019 Copa Constitució was the 27th edition of the national football knockout tournament with clubs from Andorra. The cup began on 20 January 2019 and ended on 26 May 2019 with the final.

FC Santa Coloma were the defending cup champions after defeating Sant Julià in the previous season's final by a score of 2–1.

Schedule

First round
Eight clubs competed in the first round. The matches were played on 20 January 2019.

|}

Quarter-finals
Eight clubs competed in the quarter-finals. The matches were played on 14 March 2019.

|}

Semifinals
Four clubs competed in the semifinals. The matches were played on 3–4 April 2019.

|}

Final
The final was played on 26 May 2019.

See also
2018–19 Primera Divisió
2018–19 Segona Divisió

External links
UEFA

References

Andorra
Cup
2019